Ted Mann was the transportation reporter for the Greater New York section of The Wall Street Journal and is credited with breaking the story on Bridgegate.

In 2019, he was working in the Journal's Washington bureau.

Education
Mann graduated from New York University in 2002 with a B.A. in English and American literature.

Career
He worked for more than seven years as a political correspondent and enterprise reporter at The Day of New London.

Awards
He's won two first place awards from the New England Associated Press News Executives Association (2010 for his coverage of a visit to Cuba by the American ship Amistad and 2008, NEAPNEA awarded him first-place for continuing coverage of the presidential primary contests in Iowa, New Hampshire and Connecticut).

Bibliography
Lights Out: Pride, Delusion, and the Fall of General Electric, Thomas Gryta and Ted Mann (Houghton Mifflin Harcourt, 2020).

References

Living people
Year of birth missing (living people)
American male journalists
New York University alumni
The Wall Street Journal people